The 20th constituency of Nord is a French legislative constituency in the Nord department.

Description 

Nord's 20th constituency occupies the areas between the city of Valenciennes and the border with Belgium.

The constituency is a stronghold of the French Communist Party (PCF), and was held by veteran communist Alain Bocquet from 1988 to 2017. It is currently held by PCF National Secretary and 2022 presidential election candidate Fabien Roussel.

Historic Representation

Election results

2022

 
 
 
 
 
 
 
|-
| colspan="8" bgcolor="#E9E9E9"|
|-
 
 

 
 
 
 
 

* LFI dissident

2017

2012 

 
 
 
 
 
|-
| colspan="8" bgcolor="#E9E9E9"|
|-

2007

 
 
 
 
 
 
|-
| colspan="8" bgcolor="#E9E9E9"|
|-

2002

 
 
 
 
 
 
|-
| colspan="8" bgcolor="#E9E9E9"|
|-

1997

 
 
 
 
 
 
 
|-
| colspan="8" bgcolor="#E9E9E9"|
|-

Sources
Official results of French elections from 1998: 

20